Paula Boggs Band is an American band formed in Seattle, Washington in 2007. The band was formed by former U.S. Army officer and attorney Paula Boggs (vocals, guitar, ukulele).

The band plays a blend of jazz, bluegrass, soul, folk, and Americana and describes their sound as "Seattle-brewed Soulgrass."

History 
Boggs formed the band after meeting percussionist Tor Dietrichson on MySpace and guitar/banjo player Mark Chinen at a concert while vacationing in Hawaii.

Other band members include Mark Chinen (guitar, banjo), Paul Matthew Moore (keys, accordion, vocals), Darren Loucas (mandolin, guitar, harmonica, fiddle, lap steel, vocals), Jacob Evans (drums), and Alex Dyring (bass, vocals). The band released their debut album, A Buddha State of Mind in 2010.

The band released their second studio album, titled Carnival of Miracles, in 2015. It was produced by Grammy Award-winning producer Trina Shoemaker. The album featured musical appearances from Michael Shrieve, Geoffrey Castle, and Andrew Joslyn. The band also appeared in the news program New Day Northwest on December 7, 2015.

In February 2017, the band performed on the television program Band in Seattle. In 2017, the band also released the single "Benediction," which was written in response to the 2015 Charleston church shooting. The band also released a cover of the Bon Iver song "Holocene." Both of these songs appeared on the band's album Elixir: The Soulgrass Sessions, which was released in September 2017. In the same year, the band released a live EP titled Songs of Protest and Hope.

In 2018, Paula Boggs Band released a Christmas single titled "Mistletoe & Shiny Guitars."

The band released an EP titled Electrokitty Sessions in 2020.

Band members Alex Dyring and Jacob Evans are second-generation musicians. Dyring is the son of Seattle Symphony violist Wes Dyring. Evans is the son of Ray Charles Orchestra jazz trumpeter Jack Evans.

References 

Musical groups from Seattle
Musical groups established in 2007
Jazz musicians from Washington (state)
Folk-pop music groups